The following is a timeline of the history of the city of Durham, North Carolina, USA.

19th century

 1865 - April 26: Confederate "Johnston surrenders to Sherman at Bennett House, near Durham."
 1867 - Durham incorporated.
 1869 - Union Bethel African Methodist Episcopal Zion Church founded in Hayti.
 1880 - Population: 2,041.
 1881
 Town becomes seat of newly established Durham County.
 W. Duke Sons & Company tobacco manufacturer in business.
 1887
 Durham Hebrew Congregation established (approximate date).
 Main Street Methodist Church built.
 1888 - Emmanuel AME Church built.
 1889
 Durham Daily Sun newspaper in publication.
 First Christian and Missionary Alliance Church founded.
 1890 - Population: 5,485.
 1891 - St. Joseph's African Methodist Episcopal Church built.
 1892 - Trinity College relocates to Durham.
 1894 - Morning Herald newspaper in publication.
 1898 - North Carolina Mutual Life Insurance Company in business.

20th century
 1901
 "Durham City limits quadruple in size."
 Lincoln Hospital established.
 1906
 Durham Chamber of Commerce established.
 Immaculate Conception Catholic Church built.
 1908 - St. Joseph's Episcopal Church built.
 1909
 Arcade Theatre built.
 Ebenezer Baptist Church established.
 1910 - Population: 18,241.
 1913 - Durham Colored Library founded.
 1919 - Carolina Times newspaper begins publication.
 1923 - National Religious Training School and Chautauqua opens.
 1924 - Trinity College renamed "Duke University".
 1925
 North Carolina College for Negroes active.
 Daisy Scarborough Nursery School founded.
 1926 - Duke University's Divinity School established.
 1930
 Ephphatha Church built.
 Duke University's School of Medicine opens.
 Population: 52,037.
 1933
 Desegregation lawsuit Hocutt v. Wilson filed.
 Calvert Method School founded.
 1934 - WDNC radio begins broadcasting.
 1936 - Three Arts founded.
 1939
 North Carolina College for Negroes law school established.
 Center Theatre opens.
 1944 - Durham Labor Journal begins publication.
 1945 - Durham Drive-In cinema opens.
 1950 - Population: 73,368.
 1954 - WTVD (television) begins broadcasting.
 1955 - Raleigh-Durham Airport terminal opens.
 1957 - June 23: Royal Ice Cream Sit-in protest for civil rights.
 1958 - Durham Redevelopment Commission and Research Triangle Institute founded.
 1959 - Research Triangle Park established.
 1960 - Population: 84,642.
 1961 - Durham Industrial Education Center opens.
 1962 - Carolina Friends School and Bennett Place state historic site
 1964 - Anti-poverty Operation Breakthrough (program) established.
 1966 - United Organizations for Community Improvement formed.
 1968 - City Human Relations Commission and Women-in-Action for the Prevention of Violence and Its Causes established.
 1969
 March 11: Student demonstration.
 North Carolina Central University active.
 Duke University's School of Business and Museum of Art established.
 1970
 Institute for Southern Studies headquartered in Durham.
 Population: 100,768 city; 446,074 metro.
 1972 - Durham Voters Alliance founded.
 1974 - Duke Homestead and Tobacco Factory state historic site established.
 1975 - Ar-Razzaq Islamic Center founded.
 1980 - Population: 100,831 city; 560,774 metro.
 1985 - Atlantic Coast Sikh Association headquartered in Durham.
 1990 - Population: 154,580 city; 735,480 metro.
 1991
 Herald-Sun newspaper in publication.
 Carmike Cinema 7 in business.
 1993 - Sylvia Kerckhoff becomes mayor.
 1995 - Old West Durham Neighborhood Association established.
 1997
 City website online (approximate date).
 Nick Tennyson becomes mayor.
 1998
 Triangle Tribune newspaper begins publication.
 WRAZ (TV) begins broadcasting from Durham.
 2000 - Population: 187,035 city; 1,187,941 metro.

21st century

 2001 - Bill Bell becomes mayor.
 2002 - Buddhist Mindfulness Practice Center founded.
 2004 - G. K. Butterfield becomes U.S. representative for North Carolina's 1st congressional district.
 2005 - Duke University's Nasher Museum of Art building opens.
 2006 - Duke lacrosse scandal occurs.
 2007 - Southern Coalition for Social Justice formed.
 2010 - Population: 228,330 city; 1,749,525 metro.

See also
 Durham history
 National Register of Historic Places listings in Durham County, North Carolina
 Duke University timeline
 Timelines of other cities in North Carolina: Asheville, Charlotte, Fayetteville, Greensboro, Raleigh, Wilmington, Winston-Salem

References

Bibliography

Published in the 20th century
 
 Story of Durham: City of the New South, William Boyd (1925)
 Durham, NC: A Center of Education and Industry (1926)
 . + Chronology
 
 Durham: A Pictorial History, by Joel Kostyu (1978)
 
 Durham Architectural and Historic  Inventory. Published by the City of Durham (1982)
 

Published in the 21st century
 Bull Durham: Business Bonanza, BWC Roberts and Snow E. Roberts (2002)
 Our Separate Ways: Women and The Black Freedom Movement in Durham, North Carolina, Christina Greene (2005)

External links

  (city directories, etc.)
 
 Items related to Durham, NC, various dates (via Digital Public Library of America).

 
Durham